The World Pilot Gig Championships are an annual gig racing event held on the Isles of Scilly, United Kingdom during the May Day bank holiday weekend.

The World Championships were first held in 1990, only attracting a few crews from Cornwall, but over the years the amount of pilot gigs attending has increased with crews coming from all over the South of England, the Netherlands, Ireland, France and beyond.

Races 
There are multiple races that take place over the weekend, of varying distance, all starting on the Friday night. The women's and men's Veterans (40+) and Super Veterans (50+) races take place on Friday evening, while the four Open races take place on Saturday and Sunday. Traditionally a sailing race is held on the Monday along with an Isles of Scilly vs Mainland rugby union match.

St Agnes

The longest race is from the island of St. Agnes down to the finish line just off the quay of St. Mary's (approx 1.6 nautical miles). Both Veterans and Super Veterans races follow this course to decide the winner of the trophy for these categories.

On the Saturday the women and men race separately, with a full line up of gigs. In 2019 163 gigs were on the women's start line with 160 crews competing in the men's race. The finishing positions from the St. Agnes course determine the seedings for the subsequent heats.

Nut Rock

Each gig is seeded based on the St. Agnes race and the heats are split into groups of 12 for the race from Nut Rock back to St. Mary's (approx 1.1 nautical miles). Two heats are held - one on Saturday and one of Sunday morning - with the top two gigs in each group being promoted and the bottom two relegated.

The finals for both the women and men take place on the Sunday afternoon, again racing the same Nut Rock course. Each group then has a winner and the outcome of group A decides who is the overall champions.

Results 

Women's Results

Men's Results

Results by Crew
Women

Men

External links

Official site
World Pilot Gig Resource
Gig Rower

References

Rowing competitions
Sports competitions in England
Isles of Scilly
Sport in Cornwall
Rowing in the United Kingdom
Rowing competitions in the United Kingdom